The 3,7 cm KPÚV vz. 34 (designated 3,7 cm PaK 34(t) in German service) was an anti-tank gun produced by the Škoda Works in Czechoslovakia. Škoda's own designation for it was A3. It is not known if guns seized by Germany after the occupation of Bohemia-Moravia saw service in World War II. Slovakia acquired 113 when it declared independence from Czechoslovakia in March 1939.

The gun had a small shield and wooden-spoked wheels, although some were fitted with pneumatic wheels.

ÚV vz. 34 tank gun
The vz.34 comprised the main armament of a number of Czech/German armored vehicles.

Armored vehicles:
 T-32 (Š-I-D) - Czech tank-destroyer.
 LT vz. 34 - Czech light-tank.
 LT vz. 35/Panzer 35(t) - Czech/German light-tank.

Performance

See also 

 Weapons of Czechoslovakia interwar period

Notes

References
  
 

World War II anti-tank guns
37 mm artillery
Artillery of Czechoslovakia
World War II tank guns
Tank guns of Czechoslovakia
Military equipment introduced in the 1930s